This is a non-exhaustive list of Mexico women's international footballers – association football players who have appeared at least once for the senior Mexico women's national football team.

Players

See also 
 Mexico women's national football team

References
Notes

Citations

 
Mexico
Association football player non-biographical articles